Klotho (minor planet designation: 97 Klotho) is a fairly large main-belt asteroid. While it is an M-type, its radar albedo is too low to allow a nickel-iron composition.  Klotho is similar to 21 Lutetia and 22 Kalliope in that all three are M-types of unknown composition. Klotho was found by Ernst Tempel on February 17, 1868. It was his fifth and final asteroid discovery. It is named after Klotho or Clotho, one of the three Moirai, or Fates, in Greek mythology.

13-cm radar observations of this asteroid from the Arecibo Observatory between 1980 and 1985 were used to produce a diameter estimate of 108 km.

In 1990, the asteroid was observed for four nights from the Collurania-Teramo Observatory in Italy, producing an asymmetric light curve that showed a rotation period of 10.927 ± 0.001 hours and a brightness variation of 0.17 ± 0.02 in magnitude. This period confirms a value independently determined in 1971.

References

External links
 
 

Background asteroids
Klotho
Klotho
M-type asteroids (Tholen)
18680217